Lygisaurus is a genus of skinks, lizards in the family Scincidae.

Geographic range
Species of Lygisaurus are found in Australia and New Guinea.

Species
The following 14 species are recognized as being valid.

Lygisaurus absconditus  - Mt. Surprise litter-skink
Lygisaurus aeratus  - large-disced litter-skink
Lygisaurus curtus 
Lygisaurus foliorum  - tree-base litter-skink
Lygisaurus laevis  - rainforest edge litter-skink
Lygisaurus macfarlani  - translucent litter-skink
Lygisaurus malleolus  - red-tailed litter-skink
Lygisaurus novaeguineae 
Lygisaurus parrhasius  - fire-tailed rainbow-skink
Lygisaurus rimula  - crevice rainbow-skink 
Lygisaurus rococo  - Chillagoe litter-skink
Lygisaurus sesbrauna  - Eastern Cape litter-skink
Lygisaurus tanneri  - Endeavour River litter-skink 
Lygisaurus zuma  - sun-loving litter-skink

Nota bene: A binomial authority in parentheses indicates that the species was originally described in a genus other than Lygisaurus.

References

Further reading
De Vis CW (1884). "New Queensland Lizards". Proc. Royal Soc. Queensland 1: 77–78. (Lygisaurus, new genus, p. 77).

 
Lizard genera
Taxa named by Charles Walter De Vis